Men's Slalom World Cup 1988/1989

Calendar

Final point standings

In Men's Slalom World Cup 1988/89 all results count.

Men's Slalom Team Results

bold indicate highest score - italics indicate race wins

External links
FIS-ski.com - World Cup standings - Slalom 1989

World Cup
FIS Alpine Ski World Cup slalom men's discipline titles